Beautiful Eyes is a 2008 EP by Taylor Swift, or its title track.

Beautiful Eyes may also refer to:

 "Beautiful Eyes", a song by Glenn Lewis from the album World Outside My Window, 2002
 "Beautiful Eyes", a song by the Naked Brothers Band from the album The Naked Brothers Band, 2007
 "Beautiful Eyes", a song by Hans Zimmer from the soundtrack album to Sherlock Holmes: A Game of Shadows, 2011
 "Beautiful Eyes", a 1949 song by Art Mooney
 "Beautiful Eyes", a 2012 song by Ripley